A sound unit is any acoustic unit of sound measurement.

dB, decibel - noise of sound measurement is called decibels (dB). Ratio of the sound pressure to reference pressure to something in it.
sone - a unit of perceived loudness equal to the loudness of a 1000-hertz tone at 40 dB above threshold, starting with 1 sone.
phon - a unit of subjective loudness.
Hz, hertz = unit of sound frequency is called hertz (Hz)

Sound
Systems of units